The Columbia Lions basketball team is the basketball team that represents Columbia University in New York City. The school's team currently competes in the Ivy League. The team's last appearance in the NCAA Division I men's basketball tournament was in 1968. The Lions are led by head coach Jim Engles. Their home games are held in the Levien Gymnasium.

Columbia began varsity intercollegiate competition in men's basketball in 1901. The Lions were retroactively recognized as the pre-NCAA Tournament 1904 and 1905 national champions by the Premo-Porretta Power Poll, and as the 1904, 1905, and 1910 national champions by the Helms Athletic Foundation.

Postseason results

NCAA tournament results
The Lions have appeared in the NCAA Tournament three times. Their combined record is 2–4.

CIT results
The Lions have appeared in two CollegeInsider.com Postseason Tournament (CIT). Their combined record is 6–1. They were CIT champions in 2016.

Lions in international leagues
 Bob Griffin (born 1950), American-Israeli basketball player, and English Literature professor

See also
 2022–23 Columbia Lions women's basketball team

References

External links